Scarlett Mackmin is an English choreographer. She trained in New York City and at the Laban Centre for Movement and Dance in London. 

Her work for the theatre includes The Hypochondriac (Almeida), President of an Empty Room (National Theatre), Sleeping Beauty (Barbican), The Dark, Caligula, After Miss Julie, Privates on Parade (Donmar Warehouse), Cloud Nine, The Modernist, A Midsummer Night's Dream, The Tempest, Bird Calls, Batina and the Moon, Iphigenia (Sheffield Crucible), Peribanez, Sleeping Beauty (Young Vic), A Midsummer Night's Dream, The Two Gentlemen of Verona (Regent's Park), Up on the Roof (Minerva, Chichester), In Flame (Bush Theatre/New Ambassadors) and Airswimming (BAC).

Her film credits include Empire of Light, Allelujah, The King's Speech, Stage Beauty, Chocolat, The Last Minute, and Miss Julie.

Her television credits include The Crown and Wheel of Time.

She is the sister of theatre director Anna Mackmin.

External links
 

English women choreographers
Living people
Year of birth missing (living people)